Bankston may refer to:

Places in the United States
Bankston, Alabama
Bankston, Iowa
Bankston, Mississippi

Other uses
Bankston (surname)